Mytran Wars is a 2009 turn-based tactics video game for the PlayStation Portable.

Plot 
It's the 23rd century, the Earth's natural resources are virtually exhausted and the ruling multinational conglomerates are searching for new raw material deposits in space in order to avert the impending catastrophe.

One planet turns out to be a real El Dorado, full of natural resources. But as the human conquerors in their armed mecha encounter the extraterrestrial inhabitants a dreadful war breaks out. In this strategy title, the player researches into new technologies and continues to re-arm his mecha in Mytran Wars. Battles are thereby fought in vast 3D landscapes against the merciless AI or other human opponents in various multiplayer modes.

Reception 

Mytran Wars received "average" reviews according to the review aggregation website Metacritic.

References

External links 
 

2009 video games
PlayStation Portable games
PlayStation Portable-only games
Turn-based tactics video games
Video games developed in Hungary
Video games set in the 23rd century
Deep Silver games
Multiplayer and single-player video games
StormRegion games